Edmond Henry Salt James, CIE, CBE was an administrator in British India, he twice served as the Chief Commissioner of Baluchistan in the 1920s during colonial rule.

References

1952 deaths
1874 births
Companions of the Order of the Indian Empire
Commanders of the Order of the British Empire
Chief Commissioners of Baluchistan
British people in colonial India